Bayern 2 plus was a German, public radio station owned and operated by the Bayerischer Rundfunk (BR).

References

Bayerischer Rundfunk
Defunct radio stations in Germany
Radio stations established in 2005
Radio stations disestablished in 2015
2005 establishments in Germany
2015 disestablishments in Germany
Mass media in Munich